Clement Atkinson Memorial Hospital is a historic hospital building located at Coatesville, Chester County, Pennsylvania. 

The hospital was founded in 1936 by Whittier C. Atkinson, the first African American physician in Chester County, who named the hospital after his father. It served the local African American population and remained in operation until 1978.

The building contains five sections. The original section was the home of Dr. Atkinson. This section is a -story, three-bay red brick rowhouse dwelling in the Colonial Revival style. It had a one-story, eight-room, hospital wing at the rear of the dwelling, were built in 1932. A second story was added to the hospital wing in 1937. Later additions took place in 1955, 1962, and 1969. The hospital was converted to a community center and low-income apartments in 1991. 

It was added to the National Register of Historic Places in 2011.

References

Hospitals in Pennsylvania
African-American history of Pennsylvania
Hospital buildings on the National Register of Historic Places in Pennsylvania
Colonial Revival architecture in Pennsylvania
Hospital buildings completed in 1932
Hospital buildings completed in 1937
Buildings and structures completed in 1969
Buildings and structures in Chester County, Pennsylvania
Coatesville, Pennsylvania
National Register of Historic Places in Chester County, Pennsylvania